The Crane Wife is the fourth album by The Decemberists, released in 2006. It was produced by Tucker Martine and Chris Walla, and is the band's first album on the Capitol Records label. The album was inspired by a Japanese folk tale, and centers on two song cycles, The Crane Wife and The Island, the latter inspired by William Shakespeare's The Tempest. National Public Radio listeners voted The Crane Wife the best album of 2006.

The album cover was designed by the Portland artist Carson Ellis, Colin Meloy's wife, who has created artwork for each of the band's albums.

The story of The Crane Wife

The Crane Wife is an old Japanese folktale. While there are many variations of the tale, a common version is that a poor man finds an injured crane on his doorstep (or outside with an arrow in it), takes it in and nurses it back to health. After he releases the crane, a woman appears at his doorstep with whom he falls in love and marries. Because they need money, his wife offers to weave wondrous clothes out of silk that they can sell at the market, but only if he agrees never to watch her making them. They begin to sell them and live a comfortable life, but he soon makes her weave them more and more. Oblivious to his wife's declining health, his greed increases. He eventually peeks in to see what she is doing to make the silk she weaves so desirable. He is shocked to discover that at the loom is a crane plucking feathers from her own body and weaving them into the loom. The crane, seeing him, flies away and never returns.

"When the War Came"
This song is a portrayal of the 900-day Siege of Leningrad during the Second World War. During the siege, the German army surrounded the city entirely, preventing anything from going in or out. As a result, many died of starvation, and the final death-toll is estimated to be over one million. The song also has a political undertone to it; it is stated that despite the fact that people put their faith in the government which swore to protect them, they ended up being left unprepared and unequipped to fight off the Germans. The song references Nikolai Vavilov, a Russian botanist who died in a Soviet prison camp, in the lyrics. Colin Meloy explained:

"Shankill Butchers"
"Shankill Butchers" is about the Shankill Butchers, a faction of the Ulster Volunteer Force. The UVF is a Loyalist paramilitary organization. The Shankill Butchers split off from the UVF in the mid-1970s and carried out a series of grisly murders. These are the basis of the song. The Butchers abducted seven random Catholic citizens of Northern Ireland and killed them in the middle of the night by slashing their throats. They also carried out several other shootings and bomb attacks, killing as many as 32 people.

Track listing
All songs written by Colin Meloy.

Bonus tracks
 "After the Bombs" (iTunes bonus track) – 5:04
 "Culling of the Fold" (Tower Records bonus track) – 4:24
 "The Perfect Crime #1 + The Day I Knew You'd Not Come Back" (Starbucks bonus track) – 15:17
 "Hurdles Even Here" (Starbucks bonus track) – 4:31

Reception

The Crane Wife was highly acclaimed by music critics, earning an 84% positive out of all reviews culled by Metacritic, and remains one of the Decemberists' best-reviewed efforts. Jim DeRogatis of the Chicago Sun-Times praised its progressive rock influences with the tongue-in-cheek description "the best Jethro Tull album since Heavy Horses". Stephen M. Deusner of Pitchfork wrote that the album "further magnifies and refines [the Decemberists'] strengths" and that their folk rock has been "honed to an incisively sharp point". It was ranked #41 on Pitchforks list of the top 50 albums of 2006, #19 on PopMatters list of the top 60 albums of 2006, and JustPressPlay named it the second best album of the 2000s. In a listener poll by National Public Radio, The Crane Wife was picked as the #1 album of 2006.

Release
As of February 2009 it had sold 289,000 copies in the United States, according to Nielsen SoundScan, close to 100,000 more than the band's final Kill Rock Stars release, "Picaresque."

Personnel

According to the liner notes of The Crane Wife.

The Decemberists
 Colin Meloy – vocals, guitar, bouzouki, percussion
 Chris Funk – guitar, pedal steel, bouzouki, banjo, hammered dulcimer, hurdy-gurdy, percussion, backing vocals
 Jenny Conlee – piano, Wurlitzer, pump organ, Hammond organ, Moog synthesizer, accordion, glockenspiel, percussion, backing vocals
 Nate Query – upright bass, electric bass, cello, percussion, backing vocals
 John Moen – drums, percussion, backing vocals

Additional musicians

Laura Veirs - duet vocal on "Yankee Bayonet (I Will Be Home Then)"
Eyvind Kang - viola, violin
Ezra Holbrook - backing vocals
Christopher Walla - backing vocals, keyboards
Steve Drizos - hand drums

Production

Produced by Tucker Martine and Christopher Walla with The Decemberists
Mixed by Tucker Martine and Christopher Walla
Mastered by Roger Seibel
Assistant engineering by Rich Hipp
Design by Carson Ellis, Colin Meloy and Mike King
Illustrations and lettering by Carson Ellis
Layout by Mike King
Band portraits drawn from photographs by Autumn de Wilde

In popular culture
"The Crane Wife 3" was covered by Marianne Faithfull on her album Easy Come, Easy Go. She performed it live when she appeared on the Late Show with David Letterman on March 31, 2009, and on Later… with Jools Holland, transmitted on April 14, 2009, on the British BBC2 TV channel.
Also the song is played by the band in episode ww of season 6 of Parks and Recreation
"Sons & Daughters" is covered by the Schrute Family in The Office Season 9, Episode 17, The Farm.
"Sons & Daughters" is featured in Marvel's Cloak & Dagger Season 1, Episode 7, Lotus Eaters.

References

The Decemberists albums
2006 albums
Capitol Records albums
Rough Trade Records albums
Albums produced by Chris Walla
Rock operas
Progressive rock albums by American artists
Art rock albums by American artists